The 2014–15 TB2L season was the 45th season of the basketball Turkish Second Division.

There are a total of 18 teams participating in the league for the season. Each team play each other in their group twice during the regular season. Two teams are promoted to Turkish Super League for the next season and the last three teams relegate to the Third League.

Clubs and venues

Regular season

League table

Playoffs

External links
Official Site

Turkish Basketball First League seasons
First
Turkish